Liza Featherstone (born April 21, 1969) is an American journalist and journalism professor who writes frequently on labor and student activism for The Nation and Jacobin.

Early life and education
Featherstone was born in Washington, D.C., and grew up in greater Boston. She graduated from the University of Michigan in Ann Arbor in 1991 with honors and from the Columbia University Graduate School of Journalism in 2008. Featherstone was a Knight-Bagehot Fellow in Business and Economics Journalism at Columbia for 2007–08.

Career
From 2013 to 2015, Featherstone held the Belle Zeller visiting chair in public policy at Brooklyn College. She teaches at NYU and Columbia's School of International Public Affairs.

Featherstone's writing has appeared in Lingua Franca, San Francisco Bay Guardian, Left Business Observer, Dissent, Sydney Morning Herald, Columbia Journalism Review, The New York Times, The Washington Post, Newsday, In These Times, Ms., Salon.com, Nerve, Us, Nylon, and Rolling Stone.

Featherstone has also written several books. She is the author of Divining Desire: Focus Groups and the Culture of Consultation, published by OR Books, a popular history of the focus group that situates it in a political context and examines its relationship to democracy. Featherstone is also the co-author of Students Against Sweatshops: The Making of a Movement (2002). In 2004, she published Selling Women Short: The Landmark Battle for Workers' Rights at Wal-Mart, a history of Dukes vs. Wal-Mart, the largest civil rights class-action suit in history.

Personal life
Featherstone lives in Brooklyn and is married to economics journalist Doug Henwood. They have a son.

Books
 Selling Women Short: The Landmark Battle for Workers' Rights at Wal-Mart (2002) 
 False Choices: The Faux Feminism of Hillary Rodham Clinton (2016) 
 Divining Desire: Focus Groups and the Culture of Consultation (2017)

References

External links
 NYU journalism faculty profile
 Index of articles at The Nation
 Index of articles at Jacobin
 Index of articles at Alternet
 Simon Head's review of Selling Women Short
 "The Trouble With Wal-Mart," Stayfree magazine
 "Women vs. Wal-Mart"
 

1969 births
21st-century American journalists
American women journalists
Living people
University of Michigan alumni
Columbia University Graduate School of Journalism alumni
Knight-Bagehot Fellows
City University of New York faculty
New York University faculty
The Nation (U.S. magazine) people
Massachusetts Democrats
New York (state) Democrats
American socialist feminists
Brooklyn College faculty